Birnam may refer to:

Australia 

Birnam, Queensland (North Burnett Region), a neighbourhood within the locality Bancroft
Birnam, Queensland (Scenic Rim Region), a locality
Birnam, Queensland (Toowoomba Region), a locality

United Kingdom 
Birnam, Perth and Kinross, a village near Dunkeld, Scotland, the location of Great Birnam Wood in Shakespeare's Macbeth

South Africa 
Birnam, Gauteng, a suburb of Johannesburg